Frédéric "Freddie" Daquin (born 23 September 1978)  is a French association football player.

Daquin was signed for Dunfermline Athletic on 27 January 2006 by Pars manager Jim Leishman. He succeeded in becoming a regular in the team, appearing in the 2006 Scottish League Cup Final against Celtic. He scored his first and only goal for the club in a 1-0 win over Dundee United. Following Jim Leishman's resignation, however, the new manager Stephen Kenny told Daquin he was free to leave the club during January 2007.

Daquin then signed for Dundee in July 2007 although he failed to have his contract renewed when it expired in 2009.

References

External links

1978 births
AS Cannes players
Dundee F.C. players
Dunfermline Athletic F.C. players
Expatriate footballers in Scotland
FC Rouen players
French expatriate footballers
French footballers
Footballers from Bordeaux
Hibernian F.C. players
Living people
Scottish Football League players
Scottish Premier League players
Expatriate footballers in Switzerland
Étoile Carouge FC players
ÉFC Fréjus Saint-Raphaël players
FC Chartres players
Association football midfielders
Association football forwards